The HAL Tejas Mark 2, or Medium Weight Fighter (MWF), is an Indian single-engine, canard delta wing, multirole combat aircraft designed by the Aeronautical Development Agency (ADA) in collaboration with Aircraft Research and Design Centre (ARDC) of Hindustan Aeronautics Limited (HAL) for the Indian Air Force (IAF). It is a further development of the HAL Tejas, with an elongated airframe, close coupled canards, new sensors, and a more powerful engine.

The fighter is being designed and developed to replace multiple strike fighters of IAF viz, the SEPECAT Jaguar, Dassault Mirage 2000, and Mikoyan MiG-29.  The indigenous content of the fighter will be 82% initially and will cross 90% after the licensed production of its engine.

Development

MWF Programme 
Dr. V. Madhusudana Rao is the Project Director of Tejas Mark 2. The development of Tejas Mark 2 or MWF was initiated to address all the shortcomings in Tejas Mark 1 and Mark 1A, and to meet the original air staff requirements set out for the LCA programme by the IAF. The development of Tejas Mark 2 was authorised in November 2009 as a continuation of LCA programme, under the phase 3 of full-scale engineering development (FSED) process. The FSED phase 3 consisted of design, development and manufacturing of two prototypes. Initially planned as an upsized Tejas, with a 0.5 m fuselage plug to accommodate more fuel and a more powerful engine, the Tejas Mark 2 design has evolved over years into a completely new medium-weight class fighter.

The preliminary design studies for the Tejas Mark 2 was completed in 2014 and was in the detailed design phase as of 2015. The redesigned fighter was first unveiled at the Aero India air show 2019, it was a 17.5-tonne-class fighter with close-coupled canards and integrated IRST system. Metal-cutting for the Tejas Mark 2 started in February 2021. The "roll out" of the first prototype was scheduled for August 2022, but has been postponed to end of 2022. Its first flight is expected to be in late 2023. In total, four prototypes are being planned initially.

The ADA completed its critical design review on 15 November 2021, with a total of 20 subsystems for the aircraft cleared by IAF for production. From 62% in Tejas Mark 1A, the plan is to touch the 70% mark in indigenization for Mark 2. More foreign components are replaced by locally developed ones that are sufficiently matured as ADA and DRDO will carry forward some of the critical technologies from the LCA programme. Private suppliers of line-replaceable units  also increased from 344 during Tejas Mark 1A development to 410. HAL had already outsourced 25% of the work share to the private sector.

On September 1, 2022, Cabinet Committee on Security (CCS) cleared ₹10,000 crore for Tejas Mark 2 that includes prototype development and flight testing. The cost of fighter jet development will take ₹6,500 crore in addition to ₹2,500 crore sanctioned previously through internal funding. HAL planned high speed taxi trials from 2023 and limited series production from 2025. The entire development process will be completed by 2027 with serial production from 2030. Tejas Mark 2 will become operationally available from 2028. Apart from current commitment of 110-120 aircraft that will form six squadrons, expectations include an additional order of 210 aircraft.

After an initial plan to involve private players failed due to no backers, HAL is planning to form its own consortium to fast track the manufacturing process. Due to delay, the first prototype will roll out by December 2023 and first flight will happen by December 2024. Four prototypes will be made until 2027 for testing purpose. Delegation from 16 countries were seeking details of Tejas Mark 2 at Defexpo 2022. Government is speeding up efforts to identify Indian private sector company to increase the production rate and decrease the cost for exports.

Design 

Apart from design commonalities and a few critical systems from its predecessor Tejas Mark 1A, most of the technologies are to be borrowed from whatever has been developed so far for Advanced Medium Combat Aircraft programmme. Several radar cross-section-reducing measures will be incorporated in the airframe design so that a degree of frontal stealth can be achieved, including radar-absorbent material coating and composites making up its skin and twisted air-intake ducts. It has a tail-less compound delta-wing configuration with a single vertical stabilizer and close-coupled canards to provide static instability and high manoeuvrability, and is equipped with fly-by-wire systems to control instability.

This MWF is also to feature an indigenous integrated life-support system-onboard oxygen generation system (ILSS-OBOGS), from Defence Bioengineering and Electromedical Laboratory, aircraft health and usage monitoring system  to integrate various sensors onboard Tejas Mark 2 from Defence Institute of Advanced Technology and a built-in integrated electro-optic electronic warfare suite, among other improvements to avionics. Utilizing extra fuselage space, ADA designed larger air-intake for GE's F414 INS6 engine.

It will have an infra-red search and track (IRST) system and a missile approach warning system.

Sensors and avionics 
The avionics of Tejas Mark 2 will be centered on multisensor data fusion incorporating both active and passive sensors on board. The Tejas Mark 2 would be equipped with a variant of Uttam AESA Radar developed by Electronics and Radar Development Establishment, while the combat aircraft will also have an integrated IRST system for passive target acquisition. The Tejas Mark 2 will have indigenous software-defined radio-based tactical data link for secured communication and network-centric warfare capabilities supported by the IAF's AFNet digital information grid.

Cockpit 
The Tejas Mark 2 will have a night vision goggles-compatible glass cockpit dominated by a touch-sensitive wide area display placed in panoramic orientation and a wide-angle holographic head-up display system. The Tejas Mark 2 will have hands-on throttle-and-stick arrangement with right-hand-on-stick and left-hand-on-throttle settings to ease the pilot workload.

Propulsion 
In 2008, HAL issued a fresh request for proposal for the procurement of 95- to 100-kilonewton (kN) (21,000–23,000 lbf) thrust-class engine to power the Tejas Mark 2. In 2010, after extensive evaluation of both the Eurojet EJ200 and the General Electric F414, GE's F414 INS6 afterburning turbofan engine was declared as the lowest bidder. The deal covered the purchase of 99 GE F414 engines, with the initial batch supplied directly by GE, while the remainder is to be manufactured in India by HAL under a transfer-of-technology agreement.

The GE F414 INS6 engine has a maximum thrust output of 98 kN and also offers improved specific fuel consumption over the F404 IN20 engine selected to power both Mark 1 and Mark 1A variants of Tejas. The aircraft is designed keeping in mind that GE's F414 will be replaced once an Indian powerplant is available. Therefore, the future engine replacement should make minimal changes in the configuration.

Operators

Indian Air Force – 10 squadrons

 Phase 1 – 6 squadrons
 Phase 2 – 4 squadrons

Specifications (Projected)

See also

Notes

References

Bibliography

External links

 TEJAS The Indian Light Combat Aircraft, official brochure 2015 

Indian military aircraft procurement programs
Proposed aircraft of India
Tailless delta-wing aircraft
Single-engined jet aircraft